Alex Bradford (January 23, 1927 – February 15, 1978) (professionally known as Professor Alex Bradford) was a multi-talented gospel composer, singer, arranger and choir director, who was an  influence on artists such as Little Richard, Bob Marley and Ray Charles, and who helped bring about the modern mass choir movement in gospel.

Biography
Born in Bessemer, Alabama, United States, he first appeared on stage at the age of four, then joined a children's gospel group at the age of 13, soon obtaining his own radio show. He organized another group after his mother sent him to New York City following a racial incident; he continued singing after returning to attend the Snow Hill Institute in Snow Hill, Alabama, where he acquired the title "Professor" while teaching as a student.

He moved to Chicago in 1947, where he worked briefly with Roberta Martin and toured with Mahalia Jackson, then struck out on his own with his own group, the Bradford Singers, followed by another group, the Bradford Specials. He recorded his first hit record, "Too Close To Heaven" (1954), billed as Professor Alex Bradford and his singers, sold over one million copies, and was awarded a gold disc, then followed it with a number of other successes in the rest of the decade.

Artists such as Little Richard imitated Bradford's energetic style, ranging from a gravelly bass to a whooping falsetto, and his flamboyant stage presence. Ray Charles, for his part, not only borrowed some of Bradford's vocal mannerisms but based his Raelets on the Bradford Specials. His 1962 gospel song composition "Let the Lord Be Seen in Me", recorded for his One Step & Angel on Vacation album, was also recorded in 1964 by an emerging force in Jamaican music, Bob Marley & the Spiritual Sisters. Marley later adopted the Rastafarian faith, but along with his mother, at first he sang gospel in the local Shilo Apostolic Church.

In 1961, when his recording career was in decline, Bradford joined the cast of the off-Broadway show Black Nativity, based on the writings of Langston Hughes, which toured Europe in 1962. A member of the Alex Bradford Singers at that time was Madeline Bell, who settled in England after the show ended. Bradford appeared in Don't Bother Me, I Can't Cope, for which he won the Obie award in 1972.

Death
Alex Bradford died in Newark, New Jersey, at age 51 years old, in 1978 after a stroke. At the time of his death he was preparing the musical Your Arms Too Short to Box with God.

References

Further reading
Tony Heilbut, The Gospel Sound: Good News and Bad Times Limelight Editions, 1997, .
Horace Clarence Boyer, How Sweet the Sound: The Golden Age of Gospel Elliott and Clark, 1995, .

External links

[ Allmusic]
Alabama Hall Of Fame
Alex Bradford & The Bradford Singers, yahoo.com

1927 births
1978 deaths
20th-century African-American male singers
American gospel singers
Savoy Records artists
People from Bessemer, Alabama
Apollo Records artists